Tariq Al Menhali is an Emirati singer.

Early life
He was born in the city of Al Ain, and when the artist Tariq reached the age of six, he moved with his family to the capital Abu Dhabi. Al Menhali is the first UAE academic artist who graduated from the Arab Oud House Academy.

Discography

Singles
 homeland 
 I have an honest 
 Strange time 
 The joy of the holiday 
 Night and Promise 
 A thousand love 
 Lily is like lilac 
 Tolerance year 
 Auja 
 Ramadan 
 Allied Emirates
 Hadi 
 I am your intruder 
 Upscale 
 Hasayef 
 I am worried about you

References

Emirati male singers
Living people
People from the Emirate of Sharjah
People from Khor Fakkan
Emirati composers
1985 births